Eastern Road Nature Reserve is a   Local Nature Reserve on the eastern outskirts of Haywards Heath in West Sussex. It is owned and managed by Mid Sussex District Council.

The reserve has rough grassland, wetland, woodland and scrub. There are aquatic insects such as dragonflies and other invertebrates include frogs and newts.

There is access from Eastern Road

References

Local Nature Reserves in West Sussex